Joseph Karl Gruber (4 May 1912 – 29 September 1967) was an Austrian football player and manager. A midfielder, he played for Austria Wien, French club Le Havre, Maltese side Floriana and in Germany for Alemannia Aachen and Hamburger SV. He managed Dutch side Ajax between 1962 and 1963 and also coached Alemannia Aachen, DOS, Vitesse Arnhem Pittsburgh Phantoms.

Personal life
Joseph was born in Vienna, the son of Viktoria Paiha and Joseph Gruber. He was married to Agnes Margarete Savelsberg.

References

External links
 

1912 births
1967 deaths
Austrian footballers
Association football midfielders
FK Austria Wien players
Le Havre AC players
Floriana F.C. players
Alemannia Aachen players
Hamburger SV players
Austrian football managers
National Professional Soccer League (1967) coaches
Alemannia Aachen managers
SBV Vitesse managers
AFC DWS managers
AFC Ajax managers
VV DOS managers
Austrian expatriate footballers
Austrian expatriate football managers
Austrian expatriate sportspeople in France
Expatriate footballers in France
Austrian expatriate sportspeople in Malta
Expatriate footballers in Malta
Austrian expatriate sportspeople in Germany
Expatriate footballers in Germany
Austrian expatriate sportspeople in the Netherlands
Expatriate football managers in the Netherlands
Austrian expatriate sportspeople in the United States
Expatriate soccer managers in the United States